The Military Merit Medal was the highest military decoration bestowed to enlisted personnel by the Republic of Vietnam during the years of the Vietnam War. The medal was established on August 15, 1950. The Military Merit Medal was modeled after the French Médaille Militaire and was awarded mostly to Enlisted Men for valor in combat. The medal had three different versions, coincided with the political change in South Vietnam: the State of Vietnam, the First Republic, and the Second Republic version. The Vietnamese National Order of Vietnam was considered the equivalent decoration for military officers.

Award Criteria
"The Military Merit Medal is awarded or awarded posthumously to Non-Commissioned Officers (including Aspirants) and Enlisted Men in the Armed Forces, who have:
Previously received citations at the Armed Forces level.
Been wounded once or many times in combat.
Distinguished themselves by their heroic actions.
Served in an honorable manner for at least 13 years.

"The Military Merit Medal may be awarded or posthumously awarded to Allied Non-Commissioned Officers and Enlisted Men for valor while fighting the enemy in the Republic of Vietnam."

Acceptance and wear by allied forces
The United States military authorized the Military Merit Medal as a foreign decoration and permitted the medal to be worn on U.S. uniforms by enlisted personnel.  A high number of Military Merit Medals were issued posthumously as the medal was most often awarded to United States servicemen who were killed in action. The Military Merit Medal was last issued to U.S. personnel in 1973 and was discontinued after the fall of South Vietnam in 1975.  The decoration is now only available through private dealers in military insignia.

Meritorious Citation

The Meritorious citation for the posthumous award of the Military Merit Medal:

"Servicemen of courage and rare self-sacrifice, they displayed at all times the most tactful cooperation while aiding the Armed Forces of the Republic of Vietnam to repel the Red wave undermining South Vietnam and Southeast Asia.

With a ready zeal and commendable responsibility, they fought on to the end in every mission and set a brilliant example for their fellow soldiers.

They died in the performance of duty. Behind them they leave the abiding grief of their former comrades-in-arms, Vietnamese as well as American."

Many posthumous awards of the Military Merit Medal to American servicemen included the Vietnamese "Gallantry Cross with Palm".

See also
Orders, decorations, and medals of South Vietnam

References

External links
 Military Orders, Decorations, and Medals of the Republic of Vietnam

Military awards and decorations of Vietnam